The Pipidae are a family of primitive, tongueless frogs. The 41 species in the family Pipidae are found in tropical South America (genus Pipa) and sub-Saharan Africa (the three other genera).

Description 
Pipid frogs are highly aquatic and have numerous morphological modifications befitting their habitat. For example, the feet are completely webbed, the body is flattened, and a lateral line system is present in adults. In addition, pipids possess highly modified ears for producing and receiving sound under water. They lack a tongue or vocal cords, instead having bony rods in the larynx that help produce sound.

Taxonomy 
Family Pipidae 
 Hymenochirus  - dwarf clawed frogs (4 species)
 Pipa  - Surinam toads (7 species)
 Pseudhymenochirus  - Merlin's dwarf gray frog or Merlin's clawed frog (1 species)
 Xenopus  - clawed frogs (29 species)
 Subgenus (Silurana)  - common clawed frogs
 Subgenus (Xenopus)  - tropical clawed frogs

Fossil record 
The oldest fossil records of frogs more closely related to pipid frogs than to other extant frog families (Pipimorpha) extends into the Early Cretaceous. The oldest known crown group pipids are Oumtkoutia and Pachycentrata from the Upper Cretaceous of Morocco and Niger, respectively.

Included taxa after A. M. Aranciaga Rolando et al. 2019

 †Oumtkoutia Rage and Dutheil 2008 Aoufous Formation, Morocco, Late Cretaceous (Cenomanian)
 †Llankibatrachus Báez and Pugener 2003 Huitrera Formation, Argentina, Eocene
 †Pachycentrata Báez and Rage 2004 (= Pachybatrachus Báez and Rage, 1998) In Beceten Formation, Niger, Late Cretaceous (Coniacian)
 †"Shelania" laurenti Baez and Pugener 1998 Argentina, Eocene
 "Xenopus" romeri Estes 1975 Companhia National de Cimento Portland Quarry, Brazil, Paleocene
 †Eoxenopoides Haughton 1931 South Africa, Late Cretaceous (Maastrichtian)
 †Singidella Báez and Harrison 2005 Tanzania, Eocene

References

Bibliography

External links 

 
Amphibian families
Mesobatrachia
Taxa named by John Edward Gray
Extant Berriasian first appearances